Welfare Problems is an album by Randy, released in 2003 by Burning Heart Records. It contains twelve tracks, including the single  "X-Ray Eyes," which, alongside the closing track "Dirty and Cheap," also appears on the soundtrack of the Swedish black comedy Smala Sussie.

Critical reception 

Welfare Problems has received critical acclaim. Johnny Loftus of AllMusic granted Welfare Problems 4 out of 5 stars, stating that the album "finds Randy's ideology undiluted by the addition of buzzing guitar hooks and shoutable choruses to its punk rock roots." In the review, Loftus positively likens Randy to punk rock bands like Ramones and garage rock bands like The Modern Lovers, complementing Randy's "staunchly socialist stumping" in their lyrics and citing the band's clear draws from Eddie Cochran and Roger Daltrey as lyrical and stylistic influences. Loftus also compliments the album's lead producer, Pelle Gunnerfeldt, for producing a sound "with touches of fuzz and a perfect mix of lead and supporting vocals." The review concludes with Loftus stating, "Randy may want the kids to rise up, but the band knows that shouting and dancing come first." Loftus cites "A Man in Uniform," "X-Ray Eyes," "Welfare Problems," and "Dirty and Cheap" as the standout tracks.

In his review of the album, Chris O'Toole of The Bedlam Society rewarded the album 8.5 out of 10 stars, favorably comparing Randy to other bands that were part of "the recent garage influenced Rock N' Roll revival," including fellow Swedish bands The Hives, Refused, and The (International) Noise Conspiracy. O'Toole praises Randy's growth over their career since their 1994 debut album There's No Way We're Gonna Fit In, and he compliments Randy's "maniacally energetic" style. While pointing out that several of the songs on the album have more "reflective" and "personal" subject matter than others, he says, "one of the most endearing qualities of this Swedish quartet is that they are not afraid to showcase their quirky and fun side along with the harsh reality of their [sociopolitical] concerns." O'Toole cites "Cheap Thrills" and "X-Ray Eyes" as stand-out tracks, calling the latter "[a rival] and [...] certainly on par with "Hey Ya!" by Outkast for best song of the year."

Track listing

Information
 recorded at Studio Gröndahl
 all tracks except for "Cheap Thrills" produced by Pelle Gunnerfeldt
 "Cheap Thrills" produced by Jocke Åhlund
 Mixed and engineered by Pelle Gunnerfeldt
 artwork by Henrik Walse
 released by Burning Heart on May 6, 2003
 performed by Randy

Credits 
 Fredrik Granberg - drums
 Johan Gustafsson - bass, background vocals
 Stefan Granberg - vocals, guitar
 Johan Brändström - guitar, background vocals, some lead vocals
 Jennie Asplund - background vocals
 Johanna Asplund - background vocals
 Calle Olsson - background vocals
 Randy - Composer, Engineer, Primary Artist, Producer

References

2003 albums
2003 in Swedish music
Randy (band) albums
Burning Heart Records albums
Punk rock albums by Swedish artists
Garage rock albums by Swedish artists